Barrier of the Law (Italian: La barriera della legge) is a 1954 Italian thriller film directed by Piero Costa and starring Rossano Brazzi, Lea Padovani and Maria Frau. It was shot at the Fert Studios in Turin. The film's sets were designed by the art director Saverio D'Eugenio.

Cast
 Rossano Brazzi as Lt. Mario Grandi 
 Lea Padovani as Anna 
 Maria Frau as Franca 
 Jacques Sernas as Aldo 
 Franca Tamantini
 Cesare Fantoni as Max Kruger 
 Fedele Gentile
 Elio Armand
 Enzo Fiermonte
 Evar Maran
 Giulio Donnini
 Olga Solbelli
 Angelo Dessy
 Rossana Galli as Ilda 
 Silvana Stefanini
 Giovanni Onorato
 Attilio Dottesio
 Carmelo Greco
 Corrado Nardi
 Maria Zanoli

References

Bibliography 
 Chiti, Roberto & Poppi, Roberto. Dizionario del cinema italiano: Dal 1945 al 1959. Gremese Editore, 1991.

External links 
 

1954 films
Italian thriller films
1950s thriller films
1950s Italian-language films
Films directed by Piero Costa
Italian black-and-white films
1950s Italian films